This is a list of members of the Bougainville House of Representatives from 2010 to 2015, as elected at the 2010 election.

References

Bougainville House of Representatives